The 2022 USL Championship season was the twelfth season of the USL Championship and the sixth season under Division II sanctioning. The 2022 season saw 27 teams participate in two conferences during the regular season. This was the last season to feature MLS Reserve teams.

Teams

Changes from 2021
Expansion clubs
 Detroit City FC (joined from NISA)
 Monterey Bay FC
On hiatus
 Austin Bold FC (change of ownership; will move to Fort Worth, Texas in 2024)
 OKC Energy FC (no viable venue; will return no later than 2026)
Departing clubs
 Charlotte Independence (moved to USL League One)
Joined MLS Next Pro
 Real Monarchs
 Sporting Kansas City II
 Tacoma Defiance

Stadiums and locations

Personnel and sponsorships

Managerial changes

Regular season

Format
In December 2021, it was announced that divisional play would be dropped and that there would be 2 conferences, Eastern and Western. They further announced a 34-game schedule, with each team playing their conference opponents twice, with the Eastern Conference filling out the 8 remaining games with interconference opponents. In the Western Conference, the 10 remaining games would be competed with intraconference and interconference opponents. The top 7 teams in each conference will make the playoffs, with the first place team receiving a bye in the first round.

Eastern Conference

Western Conference

Results table

Playoffs

Bracket

USL Championship Final

Average home attendances
Ranked from highest to lowest average attendance.

Notes
1 One result missing
2 Two results missing
Updated to games of April 16, 2022.Sources: USL Championship & Soccer Stadium Digest

Regular season statistical leaders

Top scorers

Hat-tricks

Notes
(H) – Home team(A) – Away team

Top assists

Clean sheets

League awards

Individual awards

All-league teams

Monthly awards

Weekly awards

References

	

 
2022
2022 in American soccer leagues